Goodale State Park is a South Carolina state park located just outside Camden, SC. In addition to a  lake, that is actually a Civil War era mill pond, this park also has canoe access to Pine Tree Creek. A canoe trail follows this creek for three miles (5 km) as it winds through the parks tall cypress trees. Admission to the park is free.

History
The land for this park was donated to South Carolina by Kershaw County in 1973. The park is named after a local florist, N.R. Goodale, who helped motivate the creation of the park.

References

External links
 Goodale State Park's sciway page
 Goodale State Park's official page
 Carolina Now's page on Camden recreation

State parks of South Carolina
Protected areas of Kershaw County, South Carolina
Camden, South Carolina